Flowers for Algernon is the first solo album by Japanese singer Kyosuke Himuro. Japanese rock group Boøwy, to which he once belonged, disbanded and this album was released as his solo debut five months later.

Track listing
"Angel"
"Roxy"
"Love & Game"
"Dear Algernon"
"Sex & Clash & Rock 'n' Roll"
"Alison"
"Shadow Boxer"
"Taste of Money"
"Stranger"
"Pussy Cat"

Singles
Angel (His debut single) — #1
Dear Algernon — #2

Episode
Himuro was influenced by the novel Flowers for Algernon and composed his second single "Dear Algernon".

The lyricist of the album's last song "Hitori Fascism" is folk musician Shigeru Izumiya.

Kyosuke Himuro albums
1988 debut albums